The scarlet-rumped trogon (Harpactes duvaucelii) is a species of bird in the family Trogonidae.
It is found in Brunei, Indonesia, Malaysia, Myanmar, and Thailand.
Its natural habitats are subtropical or tropical moist lowland forest, subtropical or tropical swamps, and subtropical or tropical moist montane forest.
It is threatened by habitat loss.

References

scarlet-rumped trogon
Birds of Malesia
scarlet-rumped trogon
Taxonomy articles created by Polbot